Isaac Moore may refer to:
 Isaac Moore (footballer)
 Isaac Moore (settler)